Lubāba bint ʿAbd Allāh ibn ʿAbbās (Arabic: لبابة بنت عبد الله ابن عباس) was the daughter of Ibn Abbas, a prominent companion of the prophet Muhammad, and a great-granddaughter of Abd al-Muttalib. She was married to Ali ibn Abd Allah ibn Ja'far, a grandson of Muhammad's cousin Ja'far ibn Abi Talib and Asma bint Umais. They had children.

See also
Abbas ibn Abd al-Muttalib
Lubaba bint al-Harith
Ali ibn Abd Allah ibn al-Abbas
Fadl ibn Abbas
Qutham ibn Abbas

Tabi‘un
7th-century women
Ali
7th-century Arabs